Ahmet Yumrukaya (born 25 May 1984) is a Turkish rower competing in the lightweight coxless pair category.

He is one of the first two Turkish rowers to win a world championship title in history. Yumrukaya and his teammate İhsan Emre Vural took first place in the lightweight men's coxless pair event in the 2004 Under 23 World Championships held in Poznań, Poland.

He participated in the 2005 Mediterranean Games in Almería, Spain and won bronze medal with his teammate İhsan Emre Vural.

References

External links
 

1984 births
Living people
Turkish male rowers
Galatasaray Rowing rowers

Mediterranean Games bronze medalists for Turkey
Competitors at the 2005 Mediterranean Games
World Rowing Championships medalists for Turkey
Mediterranean Games medalists in rowing